PSR J0108−1431 is a solitary pulsar located at a distance of about 130 parsecs (424 light-years) in the constellation Cetus. This pulsar was discovered in 1994 during the Parkes Southern Pulsar Survey. 
It is considered a very old pulsar with an estimated age of 166 million years and a rotation period of 0.8 seconds. As of 2008, it is the second faintest known pulsar.

This X-ray energy is generated from the conversion of 0.4% of the pulsar's spin-down power. As of 2009, PSR J0108-1431 is the least powerful of the ordinary pulsars that have been detected in the X-ray range.

The "Very Large Telescope" at the European Southern Observatory in Northern Chile observed a possible optical counterpart of this neutron star. The object has an apparent magnitude that is (X ≤ 27.8). No companions have been discovered in orbit around this object.

References

External links

Cetus (constellation)
Pulsars